Karpagam Academy of Higher Education (KAHE)  is an educational institution located in Coimbatore Tamil Nadu, India. It was established under Section 3 of UGC Act 1956 is approved by Ministry of Human Resource and Development, Government of India.
 Dr.R.Vasanthakumar, the president of the trust a philanthropist, industrialist, entrepreneur and culture promoter.

The academy has 9000 students and over 750 teaching and non-teaching staff.

Recognition
 Karpagam University was established under Section 3 of the UGC Act 1956, of University Grants Commission, Government of India, New Delhi.
 Recognized by the Ministry of Human Resource Development, Department of Higher Education, Government of India, New Delhi.
 Accredited with A+ grade by NAAC in the Second Cycle
 Recognized by UGC-AICTE to conduct Engineering/Technology Programs
 Recognized by CoA to offer Architecture Programs
 Recognized by PCI to offer Pharmacy Programs

References

External links

Karpagam Academy of Higher Education
Private universities in India
Educational institutions established in 2008
2008 establishments in Tamil Nadu